John I, Burgrave of Nuremberg ( – 1300) was a member of the House of Hohenzollern and was Burgrave of Nuremberg from 1297 until his death.  He was the son of Burgrave Frederick III of Nuremberg and his second wife, Helen of Saxony (d. 1309).

John I married in 1297 with Agnes of Hesse (d. 1335), daughter of Henry I of Hesse.  He ruled the Burgraviate of Nuremberg jointly with his younger brother Frederick IV.  After John I died childless in 1300, Frederick IV ruled alone.

Ancestors

See also 
 House of Hohenzollern

References 
 M. Spindler, A. Kraus: Geschichte Frankens bis zum Ausgang des 18. Jahrhunderts, Munich, 1997, 
 

Burgraves of Nuremberg
House of Hohenzollern
1270s births
1300 deaths
Year of birth uncertain
13th-century German nobility